Ethan Alagich is an Australian professional footballer who plays as a midfielder for Adelaide United. He is the son of former Adelaide United player Richie Alagich. Alagich made his A-League Men's debut against Wellington Phoenix on 9 October 2022

References

External links

2003 births
Living people
Australian soccer players
Association football forwards
Adelaide United FC players
National Premier Leagues players
A-League Men players